Bernini is a surname. Notable people with the surname include:

 Andrea Bernini (born 1973), Italian footballer
 Anna Maria Bernini (born 1965), Italian politician
 Carlo Bernini (1936–2011), Italian politician and businessman
 Dante Bernini (1922–2019), Italian Roman Catholic prelate
 Domenico Bernini (fl. 1685–1717), Italian priest, son of Gian Lorenzo Bernini
 Ferdinando Bernini (1910–1992), Italian sports shooter
 Franco Bernini (born 1954), Italian director and screenwriter
 Giacomo Bernini (born 1989), Italian rugby union player 
 Gian Lorenzo Bernini (1598–1680), Italian sculptor and architect, son of Pietro Bernini
 Giorgio Bernini (1928–2020), Italian jurist, academic and politician
 Giuseppe Maria Bernini (1709–1761), Italian Capuchin missionary
 Luigi Bernini (1612–1681), engineer, architect and sculptor
 Pietro Bernini (1562–1629), Italian sculptor
 Rosalba Bernini (1762/3–1829), Italian pastellist

Italian-language surnames